Garrison is a small town in Nacogdoches County, Texas, United States. The population was 789 at the 2020 census.

History

Garrison may be named for an early settler, Captain Zadock Bonner "Zed" Garrison (April 20, 1829 – January 9, 1909). Captain Garrison served as a First Lieutenant in the First Regiment, Texas Mounted Volunteers during the Civil War.

Geography

Garrison is located at  (31.824899, –94.491299).

Demographics

As of the 2020 United States census, there were 789 people, 446 households, and 343 families residing in the city.

As of 2010 Garrison had a population of 895.  The median age was 38.  The racial makeup of the population was 67.4% white, 24.8% black or African American, 1.3% Asian, 4.7% from some other race and 1.8% from two or more races.  9.3% of the population was Hispanic or Latino of any race.

As of the census of 2000, there were 844 people, 312 households, and 218 families residing in the city. The population density was 727.4 people per square mile (280.9/km2). There were 372 housing units at an average density of 320.6/sq mi (123.8/km2). The racial makeup of the city was 67.54% White, 29.03% African American, 0.71% Native American, 0.24% Asian, 1.18% from other races, and 1.30% from two or more races. Hispanic or Latino of any race were 3.32% of the population.

There were 312 households, out of which 32.7% had children under the age of 18 living with them, 45.8% were married couples living together, 20.5% had a female householder with no husband present, and 30.1% were non-families. 26.0% of all households were made up of individuals, and 17.9% had someone living alone who was 65 years of age or older. The average household size was 2.57 and the average family size was 3.10.

In the city, the population was spread out, with 28.8% under the age of 18, 7.8% from 18 to 24, 22.9% from 25 to 44, 17.1% from 45 to 64, and 23.5% who were 65 years of age or older. The median age was 38 years. For every 100 females, there were 85.9 males. For every 100 females age 18 and over, there were 76.8 males.

The median income for a household in the city was $20,278, and the median income for a family was $27,639. Males had a median income of $28,654 versus $22,143 for females. The per capita income for the city was $12,222. About 19.1% of families and 20.6% of the population were below the poverty line, including 21.5% of those under age 18 and 20.3% of those age 65 or over.

Education
Garrison is served by the Garrison Independent School District and is home to the Garrison Bulldogs.

References

External links
 City website

Cities in Texas
Cities in Nacogdoches County, Texas